Ida Jarlskog (born 20 June 1998) is a Swedish tennis player.

Career
Jarlskog has a career high WTA singles ranking of 752 achieved on 24 July 2017. She also has a career high WTA doubles ranking of 575 achieved on 24 July 2017.

Jarlskog made her WTA main draw debut at the 2017 Swedish Open in the doubles draw partnering Mirjam Björklund.

ITF finals (1–1)

Doubles (1–1)

External links

1998 births
Living people
Swedish female tennis players
21st-century Swedish women
20th-century Swedish women
Georgia Tech Yellow Jackets women's tennis players
Florida Gators women's tennis players